Raf de Gregorio (born 20 May 1977 in Wellington) is a New Zealand former professional association football player.

Club career 

De Gregorio began his senior club career with Wellington United in 1997 before spending time in Europe with Bohemians, FC Dordrecht and Clyde. He returned to New Zealand in 2003 where he was a regular with the Football Kingz. A short spell with Finnish side FC Jokerit followed, before once again returning to New Zealand with Team Wellington. In 2005 de Gregorio again returned to Europe for a short spell with HJK Helsinki, but later rejoined Team Wellington.

International career 

He has also played for the New Zealand national football team, the All Whites, collecting 23 caps (scoring 2 goals) since making his debut in 2000 against China.
De Gregorio was included in the New Zealand 2003 Confederations Cup squad. He scored New Zealand's only goal of the tournament in a 1–3 loss against Colombia.

References

External links 

 
 
 Dutch league stats - Voetbal International

1977 births
Living people
Association footballers from Wellington City
New Zealand people of Italian descent
New Zealand association footballers
New Zealand international footballers
League of Ireland players
Scottish Football League players
Veikkausliiga players
National Soccer League (Australia) players
Bohemian F.C. players
Clyde F.C. players
FC Dordrecht players
Football Kingz F.C. players
FC Jokerit players
Helsingin Jalkapalloklubi players
Team Wellington players
YoungHeart Manawatu players
Wellington Olympic AFC players
Association football midfielders
2000 OFC Nations Cup players
2002 OFC Nations Cup players
2003 FIFA Confederations Cup players
2004 OFC Nations Cup players
Expatriate association footballers in the Republic of Ireland
Expatriate footballers in the Netherlands
Expatriate footballers in Scotland
Expatriate footballers in Finland
New Zealand expatriate sportspeople in Ireland
New Zealand expatriate sportspeople in the Netherlands
New Zealand expatriate sportspeople in Scotland
New Zealand expatriate sportspeople in Finland